Vakıf is a neighborhood of Akyazı in Sakarya Province, Turkey.

Geography 
It is 20 km from Sakarya city center.

Population

References 

Populated places in Sakarya Province